Cyclopentanepentone, also known as leuconic acid, is a hypothetical organic compound with formula C5O5, the fivefold ketone of cyclopentane. It would be an oxide of carbon (an oxocarbon), indeed a pentamer of carbon monoxide.

As of 2000, the compound had yet to be synthesized in bulk, but there have been reports of trace synthesis.

Related compounds

Cyclopentanepentone can be viewed as the neutral counterpart of the croconate anion .

The compound referred to in the literature and trade as "cyclopentanepentone pentahydrate" (C5O5·5H2O) is probably decahydroxycyclopentane (C5(OH)10).

References

See also
Cyclohexanehexone

Oxocarbons
Hypothetical chemical compounds
Cyclic ketones
Polyketones
Conjugated ketones